Georgios Tziallas (born 14 July 1987 in Ioannina) is a Greek rower. He finished 4th in the men's coxless four at the 2012 Summer Olympics.

He was again part of the Greek coxless men's four team at the 2016 Summer Olympics, taking the eighth place.

External links
 

1987 births
Living people
Greek male rowers
Rowers at the 2012 Summer Olympics
Rowers at the 2016 Summer Olympics
Olympic rowers of Greece
World Rowing Championships medalists for Greece
European Rowing Championships medalists
Rowers from Ioannina